Qabala International Airport  is an airport serving Qabala (also known as Qəbələ or Gabala), the capital of the Gabala district (rayon) in Azerbaijan.
The airport was officially opened by President Ilham Aliyev on 17 November 2011.

Facilities

Runway 16 is equipped with an ILS CAT II, which enables aircraft operations in low ceiling (30 meters) and visibility (350 meters).

Airlines and destinations

From March to October 2016 Gabala was the Azerbaijan gateway for Pegasus Airlines flights from Istanbul.
In 2017 flydubai offered summer flights from Dubai-International.
In 2018 Air Arabia tried out Gabala as a summer destination from Sharjah.

All were suspended after one season.

Statistics

See also
 Transport in Azerbaijan
 List of airports in Azerbaijan

References

Airports in Azerbaijan
Qabala District